was an Edo period Japanese samurai, and the 8th daimyō  of Nihonmatsu Domain in the Tōhoku region of Japan. He was the 11th hereditary chieftain of the Niwa clan. His courtesy title was  Saikyō-no-daifu, and his Court rank was Junior Fourth Rank, Lower Grade.

Biography
Nagaakira, first known by his childhood name of Nabetarō (鍋太郎), was the eldest son of Niwa Nagayoshi by a concubine. On June 17, 1796, he became daimyō upon death of his father. His fundamental approach from the time of his succession onwards was that of restructuring the domain's finances. Relying on his reformist karō Narita Yoriyasu (成田頼綏), he encouraged agriculture, promoted education, and assisted in the development of special crafts amongst the commoners. It was at this point that Nihonmatsu's famed Banko-yaki (二本松万古焼) glazed pottery, Kawasaki paper (川崎の紙), Hiraishi tatami (平石の畳), and Ōhira kushikaki (大平串柿; skewered persimmons) were originated. Nagaaki also encouraged sericulture and established horse and silk markets in Nihonmatsu.

Despite these reforms, the domain's finances were hard pressed due to natural disasters and other unforeseen events, as well as the shogunate's request for monetary and construction assistance on flood control projects.

Nagaakira died in 1813, and was succeeded by his eldest son Niwa Nagatomi.

Notes

Further reading
Nihonmatsu-han shi 二本松藩史. Tokyo: Nihonmatsu-hanshi kankōkai 二本松藩史刊行会, 1926 (republished by Rekishi Toshosha 歴史図書社, 1973)
Sugeno Shigeru 菅野与. Ōshū Nihonmatsu-han nenpyō 奥州二本松藩年表. Aizu-Wakamatsu shi 会津若松市: Rekishi Shunjūsha 歴史春秋社, 2004.

External links
Biography of Nagaaki (in Japanese)

1780 births
1813 deaths
Fudai daimyo
Niwa clan